Hemilienardia ecprepes is a species of sea snail, a marine gastropod mollusk in the family Raphitomidae.

Description
The length of the shell attains 6 mm.

Distribution
This species occurs in the Indian Ocean off Réunion.

References

 Wiedrick S.G. (2017). Aberrant geomorphological affinities in four conoidean gastropod genera, Clathurella Carpenter, 1857 (Clathurellidae), Lienardia Jousseaume, 1884 (Clathurellidae), Etrema Hedley, 1918 (Clathurellidae) and Hemilienardia Boettger, 1895 (Raphitomidae), with the descriptionof fourteen new Hemilienardia species from the Indo-Pacific. The Festivus. special issue: 2-45.

External links
 Melvill, J. C. (1927). Descriptions of eight new species of the family Turridae and of a new species of Mitra. Proceedings of the Malacological Society of London. 17(4): 149–155
 
 Gastropods.com: Lienardia (Lienardia) ecprepes

ecprepes
Gastropods described in 1927